River Street Station is a former train station for the Erie Railroad in Paterson, New Jersey. The station was located at the intersection of River Street and Putnam Avenue in Paterson, very close to the Passaic River. It was served by the Erie Main Line and the Newark Branch.

References 

Former Erie Railroad stations
Transportation in Paterson, New Jersey
Railway stations closed in 1963
Railway stations in the United States opened in 1883
Demolished railway stations in the United States
1883 establishments in New Jersey
1963 disestablishments in New Jersey